The mixed doubles tennis event at the 2015 Summer Universiade was held from July 7 to 12 at the Jawol International Tennis Court in Gwangju, South Korea.

Lidziya Marozava and Andrei Vasilevski of Belarus won the gold medal, defeating Alexandra Walker and Darren Walsh of Great Britain in the final, 6–2, 6–3.

Chang Kai-chen and Peng Hsien-yin of Chinese Taipei and Veronika Kudermetova and Aslan Karatsev of Russia won the bronze medals.

Seeds
The top five seeds receive a bye into the second round.

Draw

Finals

Top half

Bottom half

References
Main Draw

Tennis at the 2015 Summer Universiade